Paul N. Lazarus III is an American film producer.

In the 1960s he was an agent, his clients including Woody Allen. He ran his own production company and became chief of production for the film division of HBO. He spent a year as director of the New Mexico Film Commission then went to work for the University of Miami.

In 1985 he published a book The Film Producer: A Handbook for Producing.

Select filmography
The Cell: Part One (1971) (documentary short) - executive producer
Westworld (1973) - producer
Extreme Close-Up (1973) - producer
Young Marriage (1973) (short) - executive producer
But Jack Was a Good Driver (1974) (short) - executive producer
Futureworld (1976) - producer
Capricorn One (1978) - producer
Hanover Street (1979) - producer
Barbarosa (1982) - producer
Gringo Wedding (2006) - executive producer

References

External links
 

American film producers
Living people
Year of birth missing (living people)